The world records in disability swimming are ratified by the International Paralympic Committee (IPC). These are the fastest performances in swimming events at meets sanctioned by the IPC.

This article lists the men's world records in short course competition. The International Paralympic Committee provides information on the current world records at their official site, though the times present sometimes differ from those provided elsewhere.

50 m freestyle

100 m freestyle

200 m freestyle

400 m freestyle

800 m freestyle

1500 m freestyle

50 m backstroke

100 m backstroke

200 m backstroke

50 m breaststroke

100 m breaststroke

200 m breaststroke

50 m butterfly

100 m butterfly

200 m butterfly

100 m individual medley

150 m individual medley

200 m individual medley

400 m individual medley

See also
Men's long course
Women's long course
Mixed relay long course
Women's short course

References
General
 World Para Swimming records - Men Short Course 25 December 2022 updated
Specific

External links
International Paralympic Committee
IPC Swimming

World IPC